The Best of the Blues is a 2002 two-CD compilation album by Gary Moore. The first disc contains songs from his 1990s blues albums After Hours, Blues Alive, Blues for Greeny and, most prominently, Still Got the Blues. The second disc is entirely live. Both discs feature blues veterans Albert King, B. B. King and Albert Collins as guest artists.

Track listing
All songwriting by Gary Moore, except where noted, plus original album release and/or date.

CD 1 (Studio)
"Walking By Myself" (Jimmy Rogers)2:55 (Still Got the Blues 1990)
"Oh, Pretty Woman" (A.C. Williams), feat. Albert King4:24 (Still Got the Blues)
"Still Got the Blues" (Full version)6:10 (Still Got the Blues)
"Separate Ways"4:54 (After Hours 1992)
"Since I Met You Baby" feat. B.B. King2:51 (After Hours)
"Story of the Blues" (Single edit)4:34 (After Hours)
"All Your Love" (Otis Rush)3:40 (Still Got the Blues)
"Too Tired" (Saul Bihari, Maxwell Davis, Johnny "Guitar" Watson), feat. Albert Collins2:50 (Still Got the Blues)
"Need Your Love So Bad" (Single edit) (Little Willie John, Mertis John Jr.)4:06 (Blues for Greeny 1995)
"Midnight Blues"4:58 (Still Got the Blues)
"King of the Blues"4:34 (Still Got the Blues)
"Jumpin' at Shadows" (Duster Bennett)4:20 (After Hours)
"Texas Strut"4:49 (Still Got the Blues)
"Moving On"2:38 (Still Got the Blues)
"Stop Messin' Around" (Peter Green)3:52 (Still Got the Blues)
"Parisienne Walkways '93" (Phil Lynott, Moore)5:02
"The Supernatural" (Green)3:00 (Blues for Greeny)

CD 2 (Live) 
"Caldonia", feat. Albert Collins & Albert King5:35 (1992)
"You Don't Love Me (No No No)" (Carlin, Dawn Penn, U-Roy)4:17 (1993)
"Key to Love" (John Mayall)2:20 (1993)
"The Thrill Is Gone" (Rick Darnell, Roy Hawkins), feat. B.B. King8:43 (1993)
"Stormy Monday" (T-Bone Walker), feat. Albert King10:17 (1992)
"Cold, Cold Feeling" (Jessie Mae Robinson), feat. Albert Collins7:18 (1990)
"Further Up the Road" (Don Robey, Joe Medwick Veasey), feat. Albert Collins5:49 (1992)
"The Stumble" (Freddie King, Sonny Thompson)3:00 (1992)
"Oh, Pretty Woman" (Williams)4:07 (1990)
"Walking By Myself" (Rogers)4:10 (1990)
"Too Tired" (Bihari, Davis, Watson)3:40 (1990)
"Still Got the Blues (For You)"6:50 (1990)
"All Your Love" (Rush)3:54 (1990)
"Midnight Blues"6:58 (1992)

References

Gary Moore compilation albums
2002 compilation albums
Virgin Records compilation albums